Billy Warlock (born William Alan Leming; March 26, 1961) is an American actor known for playing Eddie Kramer, a lifeguard on the first two seasons of Baywatch and in the reunion movie in 2003, as well as for numerous daytime roles, most notably Frankie Brady on Days of Our Lives and A.J. Quartermaine on General Hospital.

Early life
Warlock was born William Alan Leming in Gardena, California, the son of Dick Warlock ( Richard Anthony Leming), a successful Hollywood stunt man who did stunts for Kurt Russell and was the stunt driver in the Disney picture, The Love Bug. His siblings include Lance Warlock and a sister, Rhonda. 

After graduation from Birmingham High School in Van Nuys, California in 1979, his father landed him a stunt job as Robin Williams's stunt double in a Mork & Mindy episode, one that was produced by Garry Marshall. Several months later, Billy auditioned for Marshall and won his first major television role as Leopold "Flip" Phillips, Roger's brother (and the Cunninghams' younger nephew), in the ninth season of Happy Days.

Career

As a young adult, Warlock had a small role in Halloween II (1981), and Lovely But Deadly (1981), directed by David Sheldon.  He later appeared in Hotshot (1987), directed by Rick King, and played the lead role in the horror film Society (1989), directed by Brian Yuzna. 

The same year, Warlock appeared as an original cast member of Baywatch, where he played lifeguard Eddie Kramer for the first three seasons. In the early 1990s, he also was on the short-lived TV Series The Hat Squad, with Nestor Serrano and Don Michael Paul from 1992 to 1993, and portrayed Lyle Menendez in the 1994 television movie Honor Thy Father and Mother: The True Story of the Menendez Murders.

He also starred on soap operas such as Days of Our Lives and General Hospital. In the latter, he portrayed A. J. Quartermaine from June 13, 1997, to December 11, 2003, and for several visits in 2005 from February 4 to February 11, when his character was presumed dead. He reprised the role from March 15 until April 26 when his character was actually murdered in his hospital room by Dr. Asher Thomas (Larry Poindexter) after he kidnapped his biological son, Michael Corinthos (Dylan Cash).

On Days of Our Lives, Warlock portrayed Frankie Brady from 1986 to 1988, from 1990 to 1991, and again beginning in June 2005. In 1988, he won a Daytime Emmy Award for Outstanding Younger Actor in a Drama Series for his performance on the series. He was let go from the soap and his final airdate was November 2006. In spring 2007, he joined the cast of The Young and the Restless in the role of Ben Hollander, Jack Abbott's campaign manager.  Warlock appeared on the show from May 2007 to January 2008.

In 2003, Warlock reprised his role of Eddie Kramer in the Baywatch: Hawaiian Wedding television film. The following year, he appeared in an off-Broadway revival production of The Normal Heart at the Public Theater in New York City. Charles Isherwood of Variety praised his performance as "sincere and nicely understated." During the summer of 2010, Warlock appeared on As the World Turns as Anthony Blackthorn.

Personal life
Warlock was married to soap actress Marcy Walker but they later divorced. He married former Days of our Lives and As the World Turns co-star Julie Pinson on August 26, 2006, in Las Vegas, Nevada.

Filmography

Film

Television

Stage credits

References

External links

Billy Warlock profile from SoapCentral

1961 births
American male film actors
American male soap opera actors
American male television actors
Living people
Male actors from Los Angeles County, California
Daytime Emmy Award winners
Daytime Emmy Award for Outstanding Younger Actor in a Drama Series winners
20th-century American male actors
21st-century American male actors
People from Gardena, California
Birmingham High School alumni